St. Paul's by-the-sea Protestant Episcopal Church is a parish of the Episcopal Church located in Ocean City, Worcester County, Maryland. It is noted for its historic Carpenter Gothic parish church, which was listed on the National Register of Historic Places in 2008.

Episcopal services were held from 1878 at Congress Hall, with a mission church built nearby in 1881. In 1898, John Waggaman of Washington D.C. donated to the congregation two lots "up the beach" at Baltimore Avenue and Third Street. The cornerstone for the new church was laid on June 6, 1900, and the first service was held the following year. In 1924, it was elevated to parochial status.

Architecture
The church is a frame church with a wood-shingled exterior. There is a corner bell tower and entrance with pointed-arch openings.

The altar, made of quartered oak, was presented to the church in 1903 by the Women's Auxiliary of the Diocese of Easton. The Italian marble baptismal font was an 1893 gift of Josephine L. Massey, proprietor of the Hamilton Hotel.

References

External links

, at Maryland Historical Trust

Churches on the National Register of Historic Places in Maryland
Churches in Worcester County, Maryland
Churches completed in 1901
20th-century Episcopal church buildings
Episcopal church buildings in Maryland
Carpenter Gothic church buildings in Maryland
Ocean City, Maryland
National Register of Historic Places in Worcester County, Maryland
Religious organizations established in 1878